Peters Glacier could mean:

 Peters Glacier (Alaska Range), a major glacier of the Alaska Range north of Mount McKinley (Denali)
 Peters Glacier (Brooks Range), a glacier of the Brooks Range in Alaska
 Peters Glacier (South Georgia) on the island of South Georgia